Leïla Heurtault (born 4 January 1995) is a French karateka. She is a three-time medalist, including two golds, in the women's team kumite event at the World Karate Championships.

She represented France at the 2020 Summer Olympics in Tokyo, Japan. She competed in the women's 61 kg event.

Career 

In 2016, she won the gold medal in the women's team kumite event at the World Karate Championships held in Linz, Austria. Two years later, she also won the gold medal in the same event event at the 2018 World Karate Championships held in Madrid, Spain.

In 2021, she competed at the World Olympic Qualification Tournament held in Paris, France hoping to qualify for the 2020 Summer Olympics in Tokyo, Japan. She did not qualify at this tournament but she qualified after reassignment of the last qualifying spots. She finished in fifth place in her pool during the pool stage in the women's 61 kg event and she did not advance to compete in the semifinals.

Personal life 

Her younger sister Sara Heurtault also competes in karate and she won two medals at the 2018 World University Karate Championships held in Kobe, Japan.

Achievements

References

External links 

 

Living people
1995 births
Place of birth missing (living people)
French female karateka
Competitors at the 2018 Mediterranean Games
Karateka at the 2020 Summer Olympics
Olympic karateka of France
21st-century French women